is a side-scrolling horror-action video game developed and published by Sega, released for the Master System in 1986. Ghost House is loosely based on Sega's 1982 arcade game, Monster Bash.

The game was originally released in the short-lived Sega Card format, but was re-released on cartridge.

Plot
The player controls Mick, a young vampire hunter out to destroy five vampires (or "Draculas" as the instruction book calls them) in each stage before proceeding to the next. In later levels Draculas may re-spawn. 

Everything is out to stop Mick from completing this task and making his way out of the mansion. The player has to punch or jump on enemies to defeat them. Arrows fly from either direction after Mick passes a fireplace and will attempt to hit him, and he must either duck or jump on them for extra points and eventually gain invincibility as per the amount jumped on (25). Players can jump to touch lights to freeze everything on screen for a few seconds. Rather than punching, the player can collect a sword on any level by jumping on a candelabra as it flies past. Exploiting the game's backgrounds and tricks provide for a unique experience as well as facilitating the expulsions of all the Draculas. The sword is useful when the player fights Dracula or needs to get rid of Fire Blowers and Mummies.

The player starts the game with three lives, and receives an additional life every 50,000 and 150,000 points. There is also an energy meter. The player loses energy after touching monsters, which leads to losing a life. The player can gain energy by collecting treasures scattered throughout the mansion, and it is restored when a Dracula is killed.

Regional version
Ghost House has been released in Brazil as Chapolim X Dracula: Um Duelo Assustador (Chapolim x Dracula: A Spooky Duel) by Tectoy. The sprite of Mick was replaced by the Mexican character, El Chapulín Colorado (The Red Grasshopper).

References

External links

1986 video games
Master System games
Master System-only games
Platform games
Video games about vampires
Video games scored by Hiroshi Kawaguchi
Action video games
Sega video games
Single-player video games
Video games developed in Japan